Petricolaria is a genus of saltwater clams, marine bivalve mollusks in the family Veneridae, the Venus clams.

Species
Species within the genus Petricolaria include:
 Petricolaria dactylus (Sowerby, 1823)
 Petricolaria pholadiformis (Lamarck), 1818 – false angelwing

References

Veneridae
Bivalve genera
Taxa named by Ferdinand Stoliczka